The Endangered Wolf Center is a non-profit wildlife facility in Eureka, Missouri, United States, near St. Louis that is dedicated to preserving and reintroducing to the wild critically endangered species of wolves. It is certified by the Association of Zoos and Aquariums (AZA). Visitors can tour the facility by making a reservation.

The center was founded in 1971 by renowned naturalist Marlin Perkins and his wife Carol, who saw that wolves around the world were in danger of becoming extinct. Its mission is to preserve and protect Mexican wolves, red wolves, and other wild canid species, with purpose and passion, through carefully managed breeding, reintroduction and inspiring education programs. Animals born at the facility have been reintroduced to North Carolina (red wolves) and Arizona and New Mexico (Mexican wolves). The center's research focuses on reproductive, behavioral and nutritional needs for the species housed there. The Endangered Wolf Center is a founding member of the AZA's Mexican Wolf and Red Wolf Species Survival Plans. As of August 2016, the center had six species of endangered canids: Mexican wolves, red wolves, maned wolves, African painted dogs, fennec foxes and swift foxes. It had more than 20 Mexican gray wolves, more than any other managed breeding facility. (Only 97 Mexican wolves were known to exist in the wild as of 2015.) The center serves as the cornerstone of the U.S. Fish and Wildlife Service's program to preserve Mexican wolves and reintroduce them to the wild.

The center offers daytime tours and evening wolf howls. Reservations are required.

The Endangered Wolf Center is an independent 501c(3) non-profit and receives no federal or state support. Its programs are supported solely by members, donors and visitors.
The center is on the grounds of Washington University in St. Louis' Tyson Research Center. The Endangered Wolf Center originally was named the Wild Canid Survival and Research Center.

Notes

External links

 

Non-profit organizations based in Missouri
Buildings and structures in St. Louis County, Missouri
Education in St. Louis County, Missouri
Tourist attractions in St. Louis County, Missouri
Dog parks in the United States
Animal sanctuaries
Wolf organizations
Wolf parks
Zoos in Missouri
501(c)(3) organizations
Animal charities based in the United States
Wildlife sanctuaries of the United States